The Now You See Me film series consists of heist-thriller films, based on original characters created by Boaz Yakin and Edward Ricourt. The overall plot centers on a team of illusionists named The Four Horsemen, who use their stage productions as a means of completing unfeasible and lucrative heists. The movies feature an ensemble cast including: Jesse Eisenberg, Mark Ruffalo, Woody Harrelson, Isla Fisher, Dave Franco, Michael Caine, Lizzy Caplan, and Morgan Freeman. 

Though the series as a whole has received mixed critical reception, they have been more met with a welcome response from audiences, and have been a financial success at the box office. The first two films combined have grossed nearly $700 million worldwide. 

The series will continue with a third film currently in pre-production.

Films

Now You See Me (2013)

On October 25, 2011, Summit Entertainment announced the release date for Now You See Me for July 18, 2013. On November 3, 2011, the company revealed the film's first synopsis and teaser poster. On January 16, 2012, shooting began in New Orleans, Louisiana, which lasted until March 26, 2012. Additional filming took place in New York City on February 13 and in Las Vegas from April 9, 2012 to the following day. Isla Fisher "nearly drowned" while filming the water tank scene. "My chain got stuck. I had to really swim to the bottom; I couldn't get up. Everyone thought I was acting fabulously. I was actually drowning," she said during an interview on Chelsea Lately. "No one realized I was actually struggling." A stuntman standing nearby used a quick-release switch to save her.

Now You See Me 2 (2016)

On July 3, 2013, after the box office success of the first film, Lions Gate Entertainment CEO Jon Feltheimer confirmed that there would be a sequel to the film, with production beginning in 2014 for an unspecified release date. In September 2014, it was confirmed that Jon M. Chu would replace Louis Leterrier (who eventually serves as executive producer) as the sequel's director. On October 2, 2014, Michael Caine confirmed in an interview that Daniel Radcliffe would be playing his son in the film and that shooting is expected to begin in December in London. The film was produced by Summit Entertainment and K/O Paper Products. In October 2014, it was announced that Isla Fisher would be unable to reprise her role as Henley Reeves due to her pregnancy and Lizzy Caplan was cast as new character Lula to replace her as the Fourth Horseman. The sequel was thought to be titled Now You See Me: Now You Don't, with the director pushing for that name, but the studio call announced in November 2014 was that the film had changed its title to Now You See Me: The Second Act. On January 28, 2015, Henry Lloyd-Hughes was confirmed to play the role of a tech whiz kid named Allen Scott-Frank. On December 22, 2014, it was reported that Morgan Freeman was not going to reprise his role as Thaddeus Bradley, but on January 19, 2015, film director Chu posted a selfie with Freeman on his Instagram, verifying that he would return.

Future

Now You See Me 3

In May 2015, Lionsgate CEO Jon Feltheimer announced that developments for a third film were underway. In December 2016, it was announced that Jon M. Chu will return as director, with a script co-written by Neile Widener and Gavin James. Bobby Cohen, Alex Kurtzman, and Jeb Brody will serve as producers. It was later confirmed that among returning cast members, Benedict Cumberbatch will feature in a supporting role. 

By April 2020, Eric Warren Singer had been hired to do a rewrite of the most recent draft of the script. In September 2022, Ruben Fleischer joined the production as director, replacing Chu; while Seth Grahame-Smith was hired by the filmmaker and wrote a new draft of the script. The project will be a joint-venture production between Secret Hideout Productions and Lionsgate Films, with Lions Gate Entertainment distributing.

Potential spin-off

In July 2016, it was announced that a spin-off movie, starring Jay Chou was in development. The actor will reprise his role from Now You See Me 2, and with the film stated to feature a cast that is primarily Chinese. The project will be a joint-venture production between the U.S. and China, with Lionsgate Films and Leomus Pictures producing the movie.

Cast

Additional crew and production details

Reception

Box office performance

Critical and public response

References

External links
 
 

American thriller films
American heist films
2010s English-language films
Films about the Federal Bureau of Investigation
Films scored by Brian Tyler
Films about magic and magicians
Lionsgate films
Lionsgate franchises
Summit Entertainment films